India's Best Dancer 2 also known as India's Best Dancer: Best Ka Next Avatar is the second season of the Indian reality TV series India's Best Dancer. It premiered on 16 October 2021 on Sony Entertainment Television. This season hosted by Manish Paul. The Grand Finale was aired on 9 January 2022 and winner was Saumya Kamble.

Concept 
India's Best Dancer will showcase the people of some of the best dancing talent, who with their solo performances, will compete to win the show. In the Grand Premiere, the judges announced the Top 12 contestants who will have a respective mentor in the journey ahead. Week-on-week these 12 contestants will have to impress the judges and audience alike to move closer to winning the most coveted title of India's Best Dancer.

Top 12 contestants

Score chart

Color key
  indicates the contestant was eliminated.
  indicates the contestants in bottom.
  indicates the contestants got the full score.
  indicates the contestants did not perform.
  indicates the winner of the season.
 indicates the runner-up of the season.
 indicates the contestant quit the show.
  indicates the finalists of the season.

Notes 
 : On 16th,17th,23 & 24 October the episodes aired were auditions rounds only.
 : Initially Rajendra Bishnoi is in top  12 but due his injury Stand-By contestant Dibbay Das join Best 12.
 : On 30 & 31 October the episodes were Mega Auditions and selected the top 12 contestants.
 : On 6 & 7 November the episodes were Grand Premiere there contestants were not scored by judges.
 : On 18 & 19 December, the contestants performed twice (one with their choreographer and the other with the contestant) and the contestants got scores from the judges twice.
: On 25 & 26 December, Sanket did not perform due to the demise of his father and hence did not receive the score.
: On 1 January, Dibbay Das did not perform as he got injured while practicing and hence did not receive the score.

Battle of the best

Episodes

Guests

See also
Dance Plus
Dance India Dance
Dance Deewane
Super Dancer

References

External links 

 India's Best Dancer 2 on Sony Liv

2022 Indian television seasons
India's Best Dancer seasons